Antcliff is a surname. Notable people with the surname include:

James Antcliff (born 1993), British singer
A.J. Antcliff of Gewürztraminer